There have been numerous incidents on the Washington Metro over its history, including several collisions causing injuries and fatalities, and numerous derailments. The Washington Metropolitan Area Transit Authority (WMATA) has been criticized for disregarding safety warnings and advice from experts.

Collisions

January 6, 1996

On January 6, 1996, during the Blizzard of 1996, a Metro operator was killed when a train failed to come to a stop at the Shady Grove station. The four-car train overran the station platform and struck an unoccupied train that was awaiting assignment. The National Transportation Safety Board (NTSB) investigation found that the crash was a result of a failure in the train's computer-controlled braking system. The NTSB recommended that Metro grant train operators the ability to manually control the braking system, even in inclement weather. Additionally, investigators recommended that Metro prohibit parked rail cars on tracks used by inbound trains. The NTSB also recommended that Metro reinforce the 1000-series cars to help protect them against telescoping in a crash. Metro rejected this recommendation in 2002, saying the modification was impractical and might lead to "higher longitudinal accelerations" and thus greater injuries. The NTSB also advised Metro to install event recorders, similar to airplane black boxes, on all 1000-series cars. This recommendation echoed one made following Metrorail's first fatal accident in 1982, when the NTSB recommended the installation of event recorders in trains, but despite some discussion by WMATA managers, no recorders had been installed by January 1996.

November 3, 2004
On November 3, 2004, an out-of-service Red Line train rolled backwards into the Woodley Park station and hit an in-service train that was at the platform servicing the station. No one was killed, but 20 people were injured. A 14-month investigation concluded that the train operator was most likely not alert as the train rolled backwards into the station. Safety officials estimated that had the out-of-service train been full, at least 79 would have died. The train operator was dismissed and Metro officials agreed to add rollback protection to more than 300 rail cars.

June 22, 2009

On June 22, 2009, at 5:02 pm EDT, two trains on the Red Line collided. A southbound train bound for Shady Grove stopped on the track short of the Fort Totten station, and another southbound train collided with the rear of the first train. The lead car of the moving train telescoped into the rear car of the stationary one. Several surviving and deceased passengers were trapped for hours during the rescue operation. Nine people died and more than 70 were injured, dozens of which were described as "walking wounded". The moving train's operator was killed. According to WMATA, trains were not single-tracking in the area when the crash occurred, but the trains were on the same track. Red Line service was suspended between the Fort Totten and  stations, and New Hampshire Avenue was closed.

November 29, 2009
At 4:27 am on November 29, 2009, a collision occurred between two out-of-service trains at the Falls Church rail yard in Fairfax County, Virginia. According to Metro, three rail cars were believed to be damaged beyond repair. Three Metro employees with minor injuries were taken to a local hospital. The NTSB planned to launch an investigation of the incident.

The train operator, whose name was not released, was fired for "failure to follow standard operating procedures." He had been a WMATA employee since 2007. His train was moving at 18 mph; the speed limit for train yards is 15 mph, and operators are supposed to reduce their speed even further when approaching parked trains.

All twelve rail cars on the trains were damaged in the crash, and two were derailed, causing at least $9 million in damages. Train 902 (the moving train) was made up of cars 5056, 5057, 1171, 1170, 3223 and 3222. The stationary train was made up of cars 5138, 5139, 1107, 1106, 3216 and 3217.

October 7, 2019
Two out-of-service trains, both consisting of 3000-series rail cars, collided between Foggy Bottom and Farragut West as both trains were being moved to their respective rail yards affecting the Blue, Orange, and Silver Lines during the morning rush. Two train operators were injured due to the collision. Train 755 (the stationary train) consisted of cars 3141, 3140, 3121, 3120, 3206 and 3207. Train 700 (the striking train) consisted of cars 3008, 3009, 3010, 3011, 3019 and 3018. Car 3008, the lead car of the striking train, struck car 3207 from the stationary train. Both cars suffered damage as of a result. Cars 3140 and 3120 also suffered broken couplers during the collision. Cars 3008, 3009, 3120, 3121, 3206, and 3207 were damaged beyond repair as a result of the accident.

Track worker accidents
Metro had a string of three fatal accidents involving track workers in a little over a year. In October 2005, a Metro employee was struck and killed at the Braddock Road station on the Blue and Yellow Lines. In May 2006, another Metro employee died after being hit by a Red Line train at Dupont Circle station. On November 30, 2006, two Metro employees were struck and killed by a Metrorail train while performing routine track maintenance on the Yellow Line near Eisenhower Avenue station. The operator of the train was found to be at fault for not following appropriate emergency braking procedures, and was permanently barred from operating Metro trains or buses. WMATA subsequently limited when track inspections can take place and lowered train speeds to  when within  of inspectors.

On August 9, 2009, a Metro employee Michael Nash was struck and killed by a ballast regulator, a track unit that deposits and spreads track ballast onto the track bed. The incident occurred halfway between the Dunn Loring-Merrifield and Vienna/Fairfax–GMU stations on the western end of the Orange Line in Fairfax County.

He was taken to a local hospital, where he died four days later from his injuries.

On January 26, 2010, two Metro employees Jeff Garrard, 49 and Sung Oh, 68 were found dead when they were hit by a piece of track equipment at the Rockville station. They were installing new train control equipment in the track bed on the outbound track of the Red Line, towards Shady Grove.

On October 6, 2013, two Washington Metro employees were injured and a contractor, Harold Ingram, was killed when they were struck by a  section of rail following a fire and loud noise approximately 70 to 80 feet (21 to 24 meters) from the injured workers.

Derailments

 On January 13, 1982, a train derailed at a malfunctioning crossover switch south of the Federal Triangle station. In their attempt to restore the train to the rails, supervisors failed to notice that another car had also derailed. That car slid off the track and hit a tunnel support, killing three people and injuring 25. This accident occurred just thirty minutes after the crash of Air Florida Flight 90 into the 14th Street Bridge. (See also 1982 Washington Metro train derailment.)
 In January 2003, a Blue Line train carrying 46 passengers derailed at the National Airport station. This incident was followed by a string of seven other derailments in the following 20 months, some which occurred in rail yards or yard lead track.
A 5000-series train derailed on August 19, 2004, just north of the Silver Spring station on a section of pocket track used for turning Red Line trains around when they terminate at the station.
On January 7, 2007, a Green Line train carrying approximately 120 people derailed near the Mount Vernon Square station in downtown Washington. At the time, trains were single tracking, and the derailment of the train's fifth car occurred where the train was switching from the south to northbound track. The accident injured at least 18 people and prompted the rescue of 60 people from a tunnel. At least one person had a serious but non-life-threatening injury. The Mount Vernon Square accident was one of a series of five derailments involving Metrorail's 5000-Series cars, up to that point, with four of those occurring on side tracks and not involving passengers. 
Prior to this incident, the tracks were improperly inspected and problems with the tracks were not reported. 
On March 27, 2009, a Red Line train derailed near the Bethesda station, after it was experiencing mechanical difficulties and passengers had been offloaded. The first car of the second train, sent to recover the disabled train, also derailed.
On February 19, 2009, a vacuum maintenance vehicle derailed along the K Route near the  station, and derailed again the same day when it was being taken to a rail yard. The same day, a Yellow Line train with 5000-Series cars derailed near Mount Vernon Square, but with no serious injuries, as the train had already offloaded passengers.
On February 12, 2010, a Red Line train derailed at 10:13 am as it left the Farragut North station near downtown Washington. After leaving the station, the train entered a pocket track. As it continued, an automatic derailer at the end of the pocket track intentionally derailed the train as a safety measure. The front wheels of the first car in the six-car, -bound train were forced off the tracks, stopping the train. Almost all of the estimated 345 passengers were evacuated from the damaged train by 11:50 am The evacuation was completed by moving passengers into the third, fourth, fifth, and sixth cars of the consist, decoupling the cars from the lead pair, and then running the remaining four cars back to Farragut North station. The lead pair was left in the tunnel. The train was apparently mis-routed into the pocket. Central Control attempted to align a route back onto the main line but could not clear the signal. The operator, who was newly returned to service from an extended leave, was told to run past the red signal. Neither she nor the supervisor who ordered her to move the train were aware there was a derailer present at that location, or that it had to be moved to allow the signal to clear. The NTSB arrived on the scene by 12:00 pm Two minor injuries were reported, and a third passenger was taken to George Washington University Hospital. The cause is under investigation.
On April 24, 2012, around 7:15 pm, a Blue Line train bound for  derailed near Rosslyn. No injuries were reported.
On July 6, 2012, a southbound Green Line train derailed in a tunnel in Hyattsville, Maryland. Three cars derailed, but remained upright, and none of the 55 passengers were injured. Heat is thought to have played a factor in the derailment, causing a kink in the rail.
On August 30, 2013, just after midnight, a non-revenue Red Line train derailed while in transit between two rail yards. There were no injuries. The incident caused a portion of the Red Line to be closed from Fort Totten to NoMa during the Friday pre-Labor Day morning rush hour. The derailment damaged several pieces of track equipment including the 3rd rail. It was reported that rail cars 1090 and 1091, which were damaged in a previous incident at Silver Spring, were part of the derailed consist.
On August 6, 2015, an unoccupied multi-car train derailed causing major delays during the morning rush hour and effectively closed three of  the six metro lines. Several metro stations were also closed leading to emergency bus shuttles which caused further congestion as thousands of passengers, with little guidance or instruction from Metro employees, were evacuated from the East Falls Church and Metro Center stations.
On July 29, 2016, a westbound Silver Line train derailed in an interlock zone outside of East Falls Church station during Safetrack. Two cars of the passenger-laden train were described as being 'heavily damaged', although only minor injuries have been reported. East Falls Church station was shut down causing major delays and crowds the entire day.
On January 15, 2018, a Red Line train derailed between Farragut North and Metro Center stations, and involved the new 7000-series train cars. No injuries were reported. A broken rail was likely the cause of the accident.
On July 7, 2020, around 11:20 am, the first two cars (car 7502 and 7503) of a Glenmont-bound Red Line train jumped the switch and derailed at Silver Spring station. None of the 32 passengers or operator on board were injured. According to reports, the train may have passed through a red signal and entered the pocket track where another train was idling on and the switch possibly aligned back to the main tracks. The first car (7502) entered the pocket track while the second car (7503) remained on the main track and derailed. The train was travelling at a low speed as the train derailed.
On October 12, 2021, a westbound Blue Line train consisting of 7000-series cars derailed in the tunnel between Rosslyn and Arlington Cemetery causing service to be suspended between Rosslyn and Pentagon stations. No injuries were reported. In the preliminary report, one axle from the 4th car was found to be out of compliance with the specification of the wheel assembly. Service was disrupted between Arlington Cemetery/Court House and Foggy Bottom stations until October 15, 2021. The incident also caused the entire fleet of 7000 series rail-cars to be pulled from service for inspection of the axle since October 17, 2021, causing severe service reductions.

Other incidents
In 1987, a CSX train derailed near the Takoma station, where the freight trains and Metro tracks run along the same corridor. The CSX train tore through a chain-link fence and onto the Metro tracks. One car penetrated the Metro power substation building adjacent to the tracks, causing significant damage. This accident led NTSB to recommend an intrusion detection warning system along this stretch of tracks.

In 1989, an Orange Line train hit a car that had fallen onto the tracks from an Interstate 66 overpass, though the train operator was able to apply the emergency brakes and slow the train to 5 mph at impact, resulting in no serious injuries for the 40 passengers.

Train separations
On January 6, 2016, two 3000 Series cars on the Green Line separated from each other while on approach to Navy Yard station causing delays. 
On December 12, 2016, two 7000 Series cars separated from each other while operating on the Red Line at Twinbrook station.
On August 27, 2018, cars 6038 and 6039 separated from each other while operating on the Silver Line between McLean and East Falls Church station.
On April 15, 2019, a non-revenue train separated while it was being moved onto the Wiehle-Reston pocket tracks.
On October 9, 2020, cars 6075 and 6079 on a northbound Red Line train separated from each other between NoMa and Union station causing service to be suspended between Gallery Place and Rhode Island Avenue stations. There were no injuries but at least 100 passengers were stranded on the train.
On November 24, 2020, cars 6150 and 6177 on a southbound Red Line train pulled apart from each other while departing Glenmont station causing service to be suspended between Glenmont and Forrest Glen stations. There were no injuries. Immediately after the incident, Metro pulled all 6000 series rail-cars from service for a pending investigation.

Near-collisions
Metro has also experienced a number of incidents in which trains narrowly missed colliding. Another incident occurred in March 2009, near the Potomac Avenue station, when one train missed colliding with another by  after the Automatic Train Protection system failed.

Smoke incidents

January 12, 2015
On January 12, 2015, during early evening rush, a Yellow Line train departing  for  began to fill with smoke. Everyone on board was evacuated; 84 people were taken to hospitals and one person died. The National Transportation Safety Board released a statement saying "an electrical arcing event" sparked the incident. According to an Associated Press story the next day, the last fatality on the metro system had been on June 22, 2009. The report went on to state that electricity had arced from the third rail to the track, and that the cause was still undetermined. One victim was known to be in critical condition. Questions were raised about the timeliness and adequacy of the emergency response by Metro and rescue personnel.

December 10, 2019
A train was stuck in the smoke inside the tunnel at Tenleytown. Red Line trains were then forced to operate on a single track between Friendship Heights and Van Ness due to another arcing insulator failure. This led to WMATA replacing 36 arcing insulators the next day.

February 4, 2020
On February 4, 2020, smoke was reported at  when maintenance crew attempted to remove a padlock from an employee locker in a mechanical room at L'Enfant Plaza by using an unauthorized tool. The crew extinguished the fire but operators on trains that were carrying passengers were told to do a track inspection of the vicinity before the smoke can clear out. WMATA took criticism from the smoke incident.

"Lost Child" emergency pull

On July 21, 2015, a man at the L'Enfant Plaza station pulled an emergency stop lever after apparently missing his stop. The man was captured on closed circuit television forcing open the doors of the stopped train and running down the platform with a young child in hand. In accordance with Metro procedures, the entire line on which the train had stopped was secured with teams dispatched to review the situation.  The action caused extensive delays and led to outrage among Metro passengers. Several days later, Metro Transit Police reported that the man had stopped the train after being separated from a second younger child on the train platform. The man was questioned by police and no charges were filed.

Structural incidents

On September 1, 2016, the Rhode Island Avenue station was shut down due to falling debris. After two incidents of concrete chunks and metal falling from the mezzanine ceiling, Metro announced the temporary closure of the station pending emergency investigation.

Oversight
The Tri-State Oversight Committee formerly oversaw WMATA, but had no regulatory authority. Metro's safety department usually was in charge of investigating incidents, but could not require other Metro agencies to implement its recommendations. In October 2015, following several safety lapses, the Federal Transit Administration assumed oversight of WMATA with the authority to conduct inspections and impose sanctions. The NTSB, which is charged with investigating every civil aviation accident and significant accidents in other modes of transportation, does not have the authority to set or enforce standards. This lack of authority has been scrutinized after NTSB recommended that WMATA take measures to increase crash worthiness of trains after collisions in 1996 and again in 2006. WMATA did not take action on these recommendations, citing tax advantage leases and an eventual replacement around 2014. NTSB, unable to compel action, classified the recommendation as, "Safety Recommendation R-06-2 Closed Unacceptable Action".

References

External links

 NTSB recommendations (2004)

Accidents and incidents involving Washington Metro
Washington